Dolgorukovo is the name of several rural localities in Russia:
Dolgorukovo, Kaliningrad Oblast, a settlement in Dolgorukovsky Rural Okrug of Bagrationovsky District of Kaliningrad Oblast
Dolgorukovo, Lipetsk Oblast, a selo in Dolgorukovsky Selsoviet of Dolgorukovsky District of Lipetsk Oblast
Dolgorukovo, Issinsky District, Penza Oblast, a selo in Bulychevsky Selsoviet of Issinsky District of Penza Oblast
Dolgorukovo, Mokshansky District, Penza Oblast, a selo in Chernozersky Selsoviet of Mokshansky District of Penza Oblast
Dolgorukovo, Serdobsky District, Penza Oblast, a selo in Dolgorukovsky Selsoviet of Serdobsky District of Penza Oblast
Dolgorukovo, Samara Oblast, a village in Klyavlinsky District of Samara Oblast
Dolgorukovo, Yaroslavl Oblast, a village in Uritsky Rural Okrug of Pervomaysky District of Yaroslavl Oblast